Contao is a village in the southeastern shore of Reloncaví Sound in southern Chile. It lies along the northernmost portion of Carretera Austral. It had 671 inhabitants as of 2017. In colonial times Contao was a place of Fitzroya logging. 

The village is served by Contao Airport.

References

Populated places in Palena Province
Populated coastal places in Chile
Coasts of Los Lagos Region